October 2017

See also

References

 10
October 2017 events in the United States